Esko Kaonpää (4 July 1942 – 9 January 2002) was a Finnish ice hockey player. He competed in the men's tournament at the 1964 Winter Olympics.

References

1942 births
2002 deaths
Finnish ice hockey forwards
Olympic ice hockey players of Finland
Ice hockey players at the 1964 Winter Olympics
Ice hockey people from Tampere